Estadio de Béisbol Beto Ávila is a stadium in Cancún, Mexico.  It is primarily used for baseball, and is the home field of the Quintana Roo Tigres Mexican League baseball team.  It has a capacity of 10,000 people. It is named to honor Beto Ávila the former Mexican major league baseball (known as Bobby Avila in the U. S.) most remembered for his years with the Cleveland Indians (1949–58) where he won the American League batting title in 1954 with an average of .341, and where he was selected to the AL All Star Team in 1952, '54, and '55. After splitting time with the Baltimore Orioles, Boston Red Sox, and Milwaukee Braves in 1959, his last year of active play was with the Tigres del México.

In the 1980s the park, originally with a capacity of 4,500 was the homefield of the Marlins de Cancún.  It became an LMB park in 1996 when the Langosteros de Quintana Roo (Quintana Roo Lobstermen) were promoted to that league.  The park was expanded to seat 7,000.  However, after the Lobstermen left Cancún the stadium was heavily damaged by Hurricane Wilma in October 2005.  In 2006 renovations were undertaken to rebuild and expand the stadium and draw an LMB team back to Cancún.  After the 28 million peso renovation the Tigres played the 2007 season with Beto Ávila as their homefield.

See also 
Estadio Cancun 86

References 

Estadio de Béisbol Beto Ávila
Béisbol Beto Ávila
Mexican League ballparks